Suitcase 2: American Superdream Wow is the second box set of 100 unreleased songs by Guided by Voices.  As with the first Suitcase box set, each song is credited to a fictional band name.  For this set's artwork, fictional artwork, album covers, and ephemera associated with some of the acts was created.

The mastering process for this set involved a cassette-deck and a consumer-model standalone CD Burner operated by bandlead Robert Pollard himself, and the transfer process left a handful of tracks marred by digital audio glitches.

The subtitle "American Superdream Wow" comes from lyrics from the song "Denied" on From a Compound Eye .

Pollard later created a band called Boston Spaceships, which appears as a song on this collection.

Track listing
Fictitious bandnames do not appear in italics.  Continuing from the previous Suitcase: Failed Experiments and Trashed Aircraft, the discs are numbered 5-8 and the songs 101-200.

Disc 5:

"The Plague"  -  This Ream   – 1:34 
"Terror Of Living"  -  Rocket Head   – 2:38 
"Ragged Enzymes"  -  The Golden Pickle   – 0:29 
"Hey John, Bees"  -  Your Charming Proposal   – 1:08 
"Wim Dials"  -  Searing Tonight   – 1:52 
"Billy Ray Human"  -  Somewhere Sometime   – 3:04 
"Milko Waif"  -  If You Think It's Easy   – 1:00 
"Wig Stomper"  -  His Spacetruck Is Strange   – 2:11 
"Child Of Joe"  -  Tin Can Laughter   – 2:55 
"7 Feet Of Sunshine"  -  Sacred Space   – 2:07 
"Bore Co."  -  Soul Flyers   – 3:07 
"Throne"  -  Gods Of Richard   – 1:32 
"Scott Joy"  -  It's Only Up To You   – 2:19 
"Ax"  -  Dancing With The Answers   – 4:06 
"Devron Zones"  -  Waiting For Your Touch   – 1:44 
"Milko Waif"  -  Soggy Beavers   – 0:45 
"The Bug-Eyed Mums"  -  Invisible Train To Earth   – 1:53 
"Seraphim Barf"  -  Stingy Queens   – 3:20 
"Karma Yeah"  -  Something For Susan In The Shadows   – 2:18 
"Heavy River"  -  Sinister Infrared Halo   – 4:05 
"Herkimer Mohawk"  -  Happy At The Drag Strip   – 2:08 
"Apes In The Window"  -  Arms   – 2:03 
"Yummy Ropes"  -  Solid Gold Animal Collection   – 1:46 
"Some Are Bullets In Dreams"  -  Beach Towers   – 4:24 
"Bleep Bleep F*ck"  -  Cosmic Clown   – 1:05

Disc 6:

"Timid Virus"  -  I Am Decided   – 2:12 
"Mutts U.K."  -  Tainted Angels With Butter Knives   – 2:24 
"Brainbow"  -  What About The Rock?   – 6:43 
"Scott Joy"  -  Pack Of Rolling Papers   – 0:26 
"The One Too Many"  -  Telephone Town   – 2:41 
"The Pukes"  -  Hey, I Know Your Old Lady   – 0:48 
"Dale Frescamo"  -  Headache Revolution   – 1:19 
"Stumpy In The Ocean"  -  Every Man   – 2:16 
"Milko Waif"  -  Alibible   – 1:37 
"Ben Zing"  -  I Can't Help But Noticing   – 2:20 
"Red Faced Rats"  -  Mannequin's Complaint   – 2:09 
"U B Hitler"  -  Zarkoff's Coming   – 1:35 
"Acid Ranch"  -  Supersonic Love Funky Love Gun   – 2:18 
"The Bad Babies"  -  Perch Warble [Studio Version]   – 1:28 
"Scott Joy"  -  You're Not The Queen Anymore   – 1:24 
"Throne"  -  Ivanhoe   – 1:01 
"Herkimer Mohawk"  -  How Can You?   – 1:53 
"Shoot'em"  -  The Lodger Carried A Gun   – 2:47 
"Modular Dance Units"  -  Metro XVI   – 1:47 
"Milko Waif"  -  My Dream Making Machine   – 1:22 
"Usually To Death"  -  Mustard Man   – 4:18 
"Wheels Pig Harvey"  -  Alone In Time   – 1:10 
"The Plexigrall Bee-hive"  -  Dusty Bushworms [Different Version]   – 3:22 
"Wheels Pig Harvey"  -  Free It   – 1:14 
"Christopher Lightship"  -  Are You Faster? [Demo]   – 3:42

Disc 7:

"The Fake Organisms"  -  A Proud And Booming Industry [Different Version]   – 2:25 
"We Too Bark"  -  Two Or Three Songs   – 2:20 
"Milko Waif"  -  Little Games   – 1:03 
"Ax"  -  Daughter Of The Gold Rush   – 4:58 
"Leon Lemans"  -  Color Coat Drawing   – 3:48 
"Silent Knife"  -  Learning To Burn   – 1:32 
"Howling Wolf Orchestra"  -  A Minute Before The Evil Street   – 1:00 
"The Needmores"  -  I'd Choose You   – 3:55 
"Wavo"  -  You're Killin' Me   – 1:40 
"Lectricalroo"  -  Old Friend   – 2:05 
"Devron Zones"  -  She Don't Shit (No Golden Bricks For Me)   – 0:51 
"Milko Waif"  -  I Have A Hard Heart   – 0:53 
"The One Too Many"  -  Shoddy Clothes   – 4:08 
"The Plague"  -  Sordid Forst   – 2:08 
"The Needmores"  -  Shake It Out   – 2:01 
"The Accidental Texas Who"  -  Cowboy Zoo   – 1:45 
"Peter Built Bombs"  -  Soul Barn   – 3:16 
"Modular Dance Units"  -  Phase IV (Rise Of The Ants)   – 3:22 
"Burial Wind"  -  Piece   – 1:09 
"Sucko"  -  Lonely Town   – 2:46 
"Wavo"  -  Do Be   – 1:02 
"Academy Of Crowsfeet"  -  Boston Spaceships   – 2:44 
"Scott Joy"  -  Drugs & Eggs   – 2:32 
"Stumpy In The Ocean"  -  That Ain't No Good   – 2:31 
"Alvin Haisles"  -  Immediate Frozen Lookalikes   – 0:43

Disc 8:

"7 Feet Of Sunshine"  -  Madroom Assistance   – 2:31 
"Praying Man vs. Bo Diddley" - Man of Dimension  – 2:21
"Alvin Haisles"  -  Nerve Gas   – 0:47 
"The Fun Punk 5"  -  Do The Ball   – 1:21 
"Peter Built Bombs"  -  The Issue Presents Itself   – 2:52 
"The Banana Show"  -  Leprechaun Catfish Fighter   – 0:29 
"Leon Lemans"  -  Child   – 3:12 
"Howling Wolf Orchestra"  -  Invisible Exercise   – 2:00 
"Carl Goffin"  -  All Around The World   – 1:39 
"Alvin Haisles"  -  Late Night Scamerica   – 1:51 
"Stumpy In The Ocean"  -  A World Of My Own   – 2:50 
"Milko Waif"  -  She's The One   – 0:56 
"7 Dog 3"  -  Daddy's In The State Pen   – 1:58 
"The One Too Many"  -  Cox Municipal Airport Song   – 2:25 
"Gene Autrey's Psychic"  -  Scare Me No. 3   – 1:18 
"Manimal"  -  Grope   – 2:33 
"God's Little Lightning Bolt"  -  Heavy Crown   – 2:13 
"Wim Dials"  -  So Roll Me Over   – 1:12 
"The Inbrids"  -  Home By Ten   – 2:38 
"Milko Waif"  -  Come Make My Shadow   – 1:39 
"The One Too Many"  -  Paper Girl [Different Version]   – 1:46 
"Yummy Ropes"  -  Jimmy's Einstein Poster   – 0:50 
"Hot Skin Apartment"  -  My Only Confection   – 1:45 
"Otim Grimes"  -  Groundwork   – 2:59 
"The Fun Punk 5"  -  Bye Bye Song   – 2:47

References

Guided by Voices compilation albums
2005 compilation albums